Charles Avery Aiken (29 September 1872 in Georgia, Vermont – 1965) was an American painter, and watercolorist.

Life
He studied at the School of the Museum of Fine Arts, Boston.

He exhibited at the Corcoran Gallery of Art, and at the National Academy of Design.
He had a studio in New York City and in Wellesley, Massachusetts. He was Director of the Allied Artists of America.
 
His work is in the Brooklyn Museum, the National Museum of American History, and the Dallas Museum of Art.
His papers are held at the Archives of American Art.

References

External links
http://collections.si.edu/search/results.jsp?q=Aiken+Charles+Avery
"Allied Artists of America records, 1914-1977". SIRIS

1872 births
1965 deaths
19th-century American painters
American male painters
20th-century American painters
People from Georgia, Vermont
Artists from Vermont
School of the Museum of Fine Arts at Tufts alumni
19th-century American male artists
20th-century American male artists